Queens Convent School is a private girls' school in the sub-city of Rohini in Delhi, India. It was established in 2002 by Sh. Ved Mittal who is the Chairman.

Staff 

The principal of Queen Mary's School is Ms. Nalini Andrew. The school's teachers strive towards the betterment of children with the prime objective of making the girls independent; socially, physically and economically.It is one of the best schools in the area.

Houses 

The four houses of Queen Mary's School are:

Florence Nightingale
Helen Keller
Mother Teresa
Sarojini Naidu

References

Girls' schools in Delhi
2002 establishments in Delhi
Educational institutions established in 2002